The Netherlands participated in the Junior Eurovision Song Contest 2021 in Paris, France. National broadcaster AVROTROS selected Ayana to represent the Netherlands through the national final . With her song "", containing lyrics in Dutch, English and Japanese, she finished in 19th place at the Junior Eurovision Song Contest with 43 points.

Background 

Although the host country was Poland, their performance was recorded remotely in a television studio in the Netherlands due to the COVID-19 pandemic. They placed 4th out of 12 entries with 132 points, while France won the contest with 200 points.

Before Junior Eurovision

Junior Songfestival 2021 
AVROTROS selected the Dutch representative through the televised national final  that was held on 25 September 2021 at the RTM Stage, a part of the Rotterdam Ahoy, hosted by Romy Monteiro and Buddy Vedder. The winner was determined through points given by a kids jury, a professional jury and public voting, each having equal weight. The kids jury consisted of  winners Unity and finalists Robin de Haas and Jackie & Janae, and the professional jury consisted of Jeangu Macrooy, Emma Heesters and Rolf Sanchez.

Competing entries 
Following the 2020 edition of the contest, the submissions process had been opened for singers who want to represent the Netherlands in the 2021 contest. Following a call for participants which closed in December, NPO Zapp revealed the list of singers who have made it through to the auditions round in January 2021. The list of finalists was revealed on 4 June 2021.  The finalists were then grouped into four acts. These acts can be soloists, duos or groups. Each act then worked on their entry for the Junior Songfestival final, accompanied by professional songwriters. The exact groupings of the acts was revealed a week later on the official Junior Songfestival YouTube channel.

Final 
The final took place on 25 September 2021. Audience members were required to take a COVID-19 test before entering the auditorium. During the online voting window, the finalists performed a common theme song titled "Let's Sing Together". At the end of the show, Ayana, a Dutch singer of Japanese and British descent, was selected with the song "". The final was watched by a total of 401,000 viewers, and was the third most-watched show on NPO3 the day of the broadcast. Overall, the show had an average of 142,000 viewers with a share of 3.9%. The average number of viewers fell by 19,000 viewers compared to 2020, however, the market share increased by 0.2%.

At Junior Eurovision 
After the opening ceremony, which took place on 13 December 2021, it was announced that Netherlands would perform fifteenth on 19 December 2021, following Azerbaijan and preceding Spain.

At the end of the contest, Netherlands received 43 points, placing last out of 19 participating countries, making it the worst result the Netherlands achieved since the contest's inception.

Voting

Detailed voting results

References 

Netherlands
2021
Junior Eurovision Song Contest